Samuel Green was a carpenter, farmer and state legislator who served in the South Carolina House of Representatives and South Carolina State Senate during the Reconstruction era.

Biography 
Green was born enslaved in Beaufort County in either 1825 or August 1847 and was put to work in the fields.

After the American Civil War he worked as a carpenter and a farmer owning a farm on Lady's Island.

In November 1873 Green was appointed adjutant general of the state militia with the rank of major.

Political career 

He served in the South Carolina House of Representatives from 1870 to 1875 representing Beaufort County, South Carolina.
When Robert Smalls resigned his senate seat in early 1875 Green and fellow representative Nathaniel B. Myers resigned to run for the seat.
Green went on to win the election, and served in the South Carolina State Senate from 1875 until 1877.

He was elected as the chairman of the Beaufort County Republican Party September 1876.

Green resigned his senate seat at the end of the 1877 session when the Democrats gained overall control of the legislature.

In 1880 he was made a United States Customs official.

Death
His date of death is unknown but he was listed alive in the 1910 United States census.

See also
 African-American officeholders during and following the Reconstruction era

Notes

References

People from Beaufort County, South Carolina
Members of the South Carolina House of Representatives
South Carolina state senators